The Georgian Orthodox Church is a major part of Orthodox Christianity in Turkey. Georgian churches in Turkey, namely in Artvin, Ardahan, Kars, and Erzurum, are under the jurisdiction of Batumi and Lazeti, Akhaltsikhe and Tao-Klarjeti, and Akhalkalaki, Kumurdo and Kars eparchies.

List of churches and monasteries

Northeast Turkey

Other areas

See also 
Christianity in Turkey

References 

 
Eastern Orthodoxy in Turkey
Georgian Orthodox Church
Georgian diaspora in Turkey
Tao-Klarjeti
Bagratid Iberia